Quasi-Objects is a 1998 electronic music album by Matmos, which followed their self-titled debut. Matmos created the album's music by incorporating ordinary sounds recorded around their home.

Track listing

Reception
Quasi-Objects has received mixed reviews from music critics. AllMusic's Sean Cooper called the album "both an improvement [on Matmos' self-titled debut] and a disappointment", with the musicians letting "the schtick of let's-make-tracks-entirely-out-of-weird-noises get the better of their aesthetic judgement." Pitchfork Media's Mark Richard-San similarly described the album as "too reliant on novelty", and thought that its central gimmick "smothered the music."

Personnel
 Design – Rex Ray
 Cover illustration – M.C. Schmidt
 Sequenced by, sampler, synthesizer [W-30, Sh-101, Mono/poly], edited by [digital editing], mixed by, banjo, electric guitar, effects [latex clothing, balloons, whoopee cushion, body sounds, field recording, quasi-objects] – Drew Daniel, M.C. Schmidt
 Written by – Matmos
 Guitar [phone guitar] on track 2 – Tim Furnish
 Slide guitar on track 2 – M.C. Schmidt

References

1998 albums
Matmos albums